John Joseph Bukowczyk (born 1950) is a professor of history at Wayne State University specializing in American immigration, history of American urban settlements and ethnic groups - in particular, Polish Americans.

He also is the recipient of the Gold Cross of Merit of the Republic of Poland and of several awards from the Polish American Historical Association (PAHA). He is also a member of the PAHA council (as of 2019).

He has degrees from Northwestern University (undergraduate in history and political science) and Harvard University (A.M., PhD American Hiatory).

Works

References

External links
Homepage at WSU
Longer profile at WSU

1950 births
American people of Polish descent
American historians
Historians of the United States
Wayne State University faculty
Living people
Northwestern University alumni
Harvard Graduate School of Arts and Sciences alumni